Bima Badi Bajwi (English: Like A Mother Sister-in-Law) is a 2014 Bodo drama family film directed and produced by Rabi Narzary under the banner of R. N. Films Production. It stars Riju Brahma in the title role, Rabi Narzary, Dinesh Ramchiary and Esha Basumatary in the lead roles. Phaylaw Basumatary, Dwimasa Brahma and Eyerish play in the supporting roles.
The film was released on 15 September 2014 at the Bagurumba Cinema Hall Runithata in Chirang district.

Bima Badi Bajwi is the 10th film of R.N. Films Production from Gohpur in Sonitpur district.

Plot
The film tells a story about a family. Sabitri (Riju Brahma), the sister-in-law of her husband's two younger brother and one sister. Sabitri loves her two younger brother-in-law and one sister-in-law like a mother. She even doesn't give birth for them.

Cast
 Riju Brahma as Sabitri
 Rabi Narzary as Sabitri's husband
 Dwimasa Brahma as Alu
 Esha Basumatary
 Phaylaw Basumatary as Alu's father

Soundtrack
The film music is by Phungja Mushahary, and songs are sung by Esha Basumatary, Arun, Usharani Brahma and himself.

See also
 Bodo films

References

2014 films
Indian drama films